Alan Saker (15 February 1921 – 26 December 2001) was an Australian rules footballer who played for the Hawthorn Football Club in the Victorian Football League (VFL).

He played with Melbourne FC Seconds in 1940 before transferring to VFA club Williamstown in 1941, where he played just one game in the Seniors but did play in the Seconds premiership team of 1941. He returned to Williamstown in 1944 when the VFA Seconds competition resumed after the World War II recess. He never played another game in the Senior team at Williamstown.

Notes

External links 

1921 births
2001 deaths
Australian rules footballers from Victoria (Australia)
Hawthorn Football Club players
Williamstown Football Club players